Lutellus Joseph Boone (May 6, 1890 – July 29, 1982) was an American professional baseball infielder.

He played in Major League Baseball from 1913 to 1918 for the New York Yankees and Pittsburgh Pirates. He worked after his baseball career ended as a pattern maker for the Mesta Machine Company in Homestead, Pennsylvania a suburb of Pittsburgh. From 1960 to 1962, Boone was the president of the Pittsburgh Professional Baseball Association.

External links

 Interview with Lute Boone conducted by Eugene Murdock, May 27, 1974, in Pittsburgh, Pennsylvania (1 hour 3 minutes) in three parts: Part 1 of 3, Part 2 of 3, Part 3 of 3
Lute Boone obituary

1890 births
1982 deaths
Major League Baseball second basemen
Baseball players from Pennsylvania
New York Yankees players
Pittsburgh Pirates players
Minor league baseball managers
Steubenville-Follansbee Stubs players
Dallas Giants players
Richmond Climbers players
Toledo Iron Men players
St. Paul Saints (AA) players
Kansas City Blues (baseball) players
Louisville Colonels (minor league) players
Columbus Senators players
Des Moines Demons players
Crookston Pirates players